The Smell of Success is a 2009 American comedy film directed by Michael Polish and starring Billy Bob Thornton, Téa Leoni, Kyle MacLachlan, and Ed Helms.

The film was produced by Initiate Productions, and premiered at the 2009 Sundance Film Festival under its original title Manure. It was given a limited theatrical release under its new title by Cinedigm in the United States on August 19, 2011.

Plot

The film opens in 1963 as the FTC is investigating the company, which is $2 million in debt.
It all begins when a tragic fan accident ends the life of Mr. Roses, the scientific genius behind Roses Manure Company, forcing his cosmetics salesgirl daughter Rosemary (Téa Leoni) to take control of the company. Rosemary isn't sure if she has a nose for the family business, but when she discovers the company is about to go under, she is determined to find a way to keep the company successful. She's going to need the help of her father's best salesmen led by Patrick Fitzpatrick (Billy Bob Thornton), who begins tutoring her in the fine art of bullshitting.

Cast
Billy Bob Thornton as Patrick Fitzpatrick
Téa Leoni as Rosemary Rose
Kyle MacLachlan as Jimmy St. James
Ed Helms as Chet Pigford
Mark Polish as Thaddeus Young
Pruitt Taylor Vince as Cleveland Clod
Frances Conroy as Agnes May

Production
The Smell of Success was filmed on location in Santa Clarita, California. Its original title was Manure.

References

External links
 

Initiateproductions.com

2009 films
2009 comedy films
American comedy films
American independent films
Films directed by Michael Polish
Films shot in Los Angeles County, California
2000s English-language films
2000s American films